The 2019–20 Turkish Cup was the 58th season of the tournament. Ziraat Bankası was the sponsor of the tournament, thus the sponsored name was Ziraat Turkish Cup. The winners earned a berth in the group stage of the 2020–21 UEFA Europa League, and also qualified for the 2020 Turkish Super Cup.

Competition format

First round
9 Third League teams and 35 Regional Amateur League teams competed in this round. No seeds were applied in the single-leg round. First round schedule was announced on 23 August 2019.

Second round
Second round schedule was announced on 5 September 2019.

Third round
Third round schedule was announced on 18 September 2019.

Fourth round
Fourth round schedule was announced on 17 October 2019.

|}

Bracket

Fifth round
Fifth round schedule was announced on 20 November 2019.

Teams

Summary table

|}

First leg

Source:

Second leg

Source:

Round of 16

Teams

Summary table

|}

Quarter-finals

Teams

Summary table

|}

First leg

Second leg

Semi-finals
	

|}

First leg

Second leg

Final

Top Goalscorers 
Note: Players and teams in bold are still active in the competition.

As of 12 August 2020. Source:

External links
 Ziraat Turkish Cup – tff.org

References 
 Turkish Football Federation Turkish Cup Results Webpage

Turkish Cup seasons
Turkish Cup
Cup
Turkish Cup, 2019-20